,  or  in later sources, was Anji of Sashiki and later King of Chūzan, one of three polities on the island of Okinawa, before they were united. He was the progenitor of what became the First Shō dynasty.

The son of Shishō was Shō Hashi, who is known as the first king of the Ryukyu Kingdom. Shō Hashi overthrew chief Bunei of Chūzan in 1406 and installed his father as king. His kingship was acknowledged by the Yongle Emperor of China, who caused a diplomatic mission to be sent to the Ryukyuan capital in 1415. He was retroactively given the surname  (Shang in Chinese) when the Emperor bestowed the name to Shō Hashi.

On 30 January 1406, the Yongle Emperor expressed horror when the Ryukyuans castrated some of their own children to become eunuchs to serve in the Ming imperial palace. The emperor said that the boys who were castrated were innocent and did not deserve castration, and he returned the boys to Ryukyu and instructed them not to send eunuchs again. This faux pas committed by Bunei contributed to, if not resulted in, Shō Hashi's coup.

Shishō was king when the forces of Chūzan invaded and conquered the neighboring Kingdom of Hokuzan in 1416.

Family

 Father: Samekawa Ufushū
 Mother: daughter of Ufugusuku Anji
 Wife: daughter of Misatu nu Shii
 Children:
 Shō Hashi by daughter of Misatu nu Shī
 Hirata Ūfuyā by daughter of Misatu nu Shī
 Tedokon Ūfuyā by daughter of Misatu nu Shī

See also 
 Ryukyu Kingdom
 Imperial Chinese missions to the Ryukyu Kingdom
 List of monarchs of Ryukyu Islands

References

Citations

Sources 

 Kerr, George H. (1965). Okinawa, the History of an Island People. Rutland, Vermont: C.E. Tuttle Co. OCLC  39242121
 Suganuma, Unryu. (2000). Sovereign Rights and Territorial Space in Sino-Japanese Relations: Irredentism and the Diaoyu/Senkaku Islands. Honolulu: University of Hawaii Press. ; ;  OCLC 170955369

Date of birth unknown
1421 deaths
Kings of Chūzan
Kings of Ryūkyū
First Shō dynasty